The 2019 Moldovan National Division was the 29th season of top-tier football in Moldova. The season started on 16 March 2019 and ended on 9 November 2019. Sheriff Tiraspol were the defending champions. The winners of the league this season earned a spot in the first qualifying round of the 2020–21 UEFA Champions League, and the second, third and fourth placed clubs earned a place in the first qualifying round of the 2020–21 UEFA Europa League.

Teams
A total of 8 teams will contest the league. These include 7 teams from the 2018 season and one promoted team from the "A" Division: Codru Lozova, making their debut in the top flight. Zaria Bălți were relegated from the Divizia Națională, ending a streak of 13 seasons at the highest level.

Managerial changes

League table

Results
Matches 1−14
Teams will play each other twice (once home, once away).

Matches 15−28
Teams will play each other twice (once home, once away).

Results by round
The following table represents the teams game results in each round.

Top goalscorers

Top assists

Clean sheets

Attendances

Relegation play-off
A play-off match was played between the eight-placed team from Divizia Națională and the third-placed team from Divizia A for one place in the next season. The "home" team (for administrative purposes) was determined in a draw held on 12 November 2019.

References

External links
 Official website
 uefa.com

National Division 2019
Moldovan Super Liga seasons
Moldova 1